Andrea Stolowitz is an American playwright and university professor based in Portland, Oregon. She serves as the Ronni Lacroute Playwright in Residence at Artists Repertory Theatre, a five-year post begun in 2017. Her work has been produced nationally and internationally and she is a three time award winner of the Oregon Book Award for Drama.

Career
In addition to her post with Artists Repertory Theatre, Stolowitz has been a longtime member of the writing collective Playwrights West, is an affiliated artist with English Theatre Berlin/International Performing Arts Center, core member with The Playwrights Center, and has been named a member of the New Dramatists class of 2024. An MFA playwriting alumna of University of California, San Diego, Stolowitz has taught at Willamette University, the University of Portland, and Duke University.

Awards
In addition to critical reception, since 2009, Stolowitz has been the recipient of numerous artist and development grants from the North Carolina State Arts, the Sustainable Arts Foundation, the Oregon Arts Commission, and the Regional Arts and Culture Council.

 2020 Blue Ink Playwriting Award for Recent Unsettling Events
 2019 Oregon Book Award for Successful Strategies
 2019 Women's Film, TV and Theatre Award with Portia Krieger
 2015 Oregon Book Award for Ithaka
 2014 DAAD Faculty Research Fellowship (Berlin, Germany)
 2013 Oregon Book Award for Antarktikos
 2013 Sitka Center for Arts and Ecology Fellowship
 2012 Lorraine Hansberry Fellowship & Hedgebrook Writers Residency
 2012 Literary Arts Drama Fellowship
 2011 Fowler/Levin New Play Prize
 2010 Soapstone Writers Award
 2006 Ledig House International Writers’ Colony Fellowship
 2005 Walter E. Dakin Playwriting Fellowship, Sewanee Writers' Conference

Works

Full-length plays
 Recent Unsettling Events
 Antarktikos
 Berlin Diary
 Ithaka
 Knowing Cairo
 Recent Unsettling Events
 Successful Strategies
 Tales of Doomed Love

Devised plays
 Pep Talk
 Psychic Utopia
 Time, A Fair Hustler

One-act plays
 So I Was Driving Along

References

External links
 Artists Repertory Theatre profile
 New Play Exchange profile
 Playwrights West profile

Living people
University of California, San Diego alumni
Columbia University alumni
Barnard College alumni
Hampshire College alumni
Writers from Portland, Oregon
Year of birth missing (living people)